English Program in Korea (EPIK) is a program to improve the English speaking abilities of students and teachers in South Korea, to foster cultural exchanges, and to reform English teaching methodologies in South Korea.  It is affiliated with the Korean Ministry of Education and is operated by the National Institute for International Education.  Established in 1995,  EPIK encourages cross cultural exchange while promoting the development of English language competence for Korean students.

History 
Formally created in 1995 under the name KORETTA, EPIK places native-speaker English teachers in Korean classrooms. Currently, participants live and teach in 16 different Provinces and Metropolitan cities.

Organization
EPIK is overseen by the National Institute for International Education, a division of the South Korean Ministry of Education, Science and Technology. EPIK provides recruitment and Guest English Teacher support from a central office in Seoul.  In conjunction with NIIED, Provincial Offices of Education offer assistance with various daily and work related affairs to Guest English Teachers.  Participants can seek guidance from representatives at their Provincial Office of Education and from EPIK.

See also 
 JET Programme, a similar program in Japan

References

Further reading

External links 

Official Twitter
Official YouTube
Official Facebook

Education in South Korea
English-language education